Alton is a census-designated place (CDP) and the main village in the town of Alton in Belknap County, New Hampshire, United States. The population was 499 at the 2020 census, compared to 5,894 in the entire town of Alton.

Geography
The Alton CDP borders include the Merrymeeting River to the south, New Hampshire Route 28 to the east, Wilbert Way and Barr Road to the north, and an unnamed lake along the Merrymeeting River to the west. Route 28 leads north  to Wolfeboro and southwest  to Pittsfield, Route 11 leads southeast  to Rochester and northwest  to Laconia, and Route 140 leads west  to Gilmanton.

Demographics

As of the census of 2010, there were 501 people, 227 households, and 125 families residing in the CDP. There were 270 housing units, of which 43, or 15.9%, were vacant. 15 of the vacant units were seasonal or vacation properties. The racial makeup of the CDP was 99.0% white, 0.2% African American, 0.4% Asian, 0.4% from two or more races. 0.8% of the population were Hispanic or Latino of any race.

Of the 227 households in the CDP, 25.6% had children under the age of 18 living with them, 39.6% were headed by married couples living together, 10.6% had a female householder with no husband present, and 44.9% were non-families. 36.1% of all households were made up of individuals, and 16.7% were someone living alone who was 65 years of age or older. The average household size was 2.21, and the average family size was 2.91.

21.2% of residents in the CDP were under the age of 18, 9.4% were from age 18 to 24, 23.0% were from 25 to 44, 27.6% were from 45 to 64, and 19.0% were 65 years of age or older. The median age was 41.6 years. For every 100 females, there were 94.2 males. For every 100 females age 18 and over, there were 83.7 males.

References

Census-designated places in Belknap County, New Hampshire
Census-designated places in New Hampshire